Philotheca cymbiformis is a species of flowering plant in the family Rutaceae and is endemic to the south-west of Western Australia. It is a low, spreading small shrub with fleshy, narrow elliptic leaves and single white and reddish brown flowers on the ends of branchlets.

Description
The ten stamens each that are free from each other and densely hairy near the base. Flowering occurs from September to November.

Taxonomy and naming
This philotheca was first formally described in 1971 by Paul Wilson who gave it the name Eriostemon cymbiformis and published the description in the journal Nuytsia from specimens he collected in the Fitzgerald River Reserve. In 1998, Wilson changed the name to Philotheca cymbiformis in the same journal.

Distribution and habitat
Philotheca cymbiformis grows on sand in the Fitzgerald River National Park.

Conservation status
This species is classified as "Priority Two" by the Western Australian Government Department of Parks and Wildlife meaning that it is poorly known and from only one or a few locations.

References

cymbiformis
Flora of Western Australia
Sapindales of Australia
Plants described in 1971
Taxa named by Paul G. Wilson